Hariharpur is a town in Chhireswarnath Municipality in Dhanusa District in the Janakpur Zone of south-eastern Nepal. The formerly Village Development Committee was converted into a municipality, merging with Ramdaiya, Sakhuwa Mahendranagar, Hariharpur and Digambarpur on 18 May 2014. At the time of the 1991 Nepal census it had a population of 6,259 persons residing in 1133 individual households.

References

External links
UN map of the municipalities of Dhanusa District

Populated places in Dhanusha District